Snickersnee - A large knife for cutting and stabbing. This word can be used as an example of a knife fight. It comes from the Dutch words steken and snijden in the 1690s.